The 1973 Pioneer Bowl was a college football bowl game in Texas, played between the Louisiana Tech Bulldogs and Boise State Broncos at Memorial Stadium in Wichita Falls. The third edition of the Pioneer Bowl, it was one of two semifinals in the inaugural NCAA Division II playoffs played on December 8.

Notable participants
Notable participants for Louisiana Tech include Fred Dean, Roger Carr, Pat Tilley, Roland Harper, Mike Barber, John Henry White, Billy Ryckman, Maxie Lambright, Mickey Slaughter, Pat Patterson, and Pat Collins.

Game summary

Scoring summary

Statistics

References

Pioneer Bowl
Pioneer Bowl
Boise State Broncos football bowl games
Louisiana Tech Bulldogs football bowl games
December 1973 sports events in the United States
Pioneer Bowl